The dwarf rasbora (Boraras maculatus) is a species of ray-finned fish in the genus Boraras.  It grows to be about 0.8 inches long at adulthood.

References

Fish of Thailand
Boraras
Taxa named by Georg Duncker
Fish described in 1904